Jeremiah Hill (born September 4, 1995) is an American-born Cameroonian basketball guard for Bàsquet Girona of the Liga ACB.

Hill attended Richmond Hill High School and in 2013 committed to play college basketball at Savannah State. Hill later transferred to Valdosta State, where in 2017 he was named to the 2017 NABC Coaches Division-II All American Team. Hill averaged 19.6 points, 5.5 rebounds and 4.3 assists per game as a senior.

Hill then played a season with the Jacksonville Giants of the American Basketball Association (ABA). On April 10, 2018, Hill signed with the Lakeland Magic. During a February 6, 2019 game against the Maine Red Claws, Hill scored a career high 30 points, including eight three-point shots, during 24 minutes of play. In July 2019, Hill signed with BC Astana in Kazakhstan.

On July 24, 2021, he signed with Parma Basket of the VTB United League.

On July 22, 2022, he signed a new transfer contract to move to Seville to play for Coosur Real Betis in Spain.

On January 7, 2023, he signed with Bàsquet Girona of the Liga ACB.

References

Living people
1995 births
American expatriate basketball people in Kazakhstan
American men's basketball players
Basketball players from Georgia (U.S. state)
BC Astana players
Guards (basketball)
Lakeland Magic players
Real Betis Baloncesto players
Savannah State Tigers basketball players
Valdosta State Blazers men's basketball players